Sylvan Lake is a town in central Alberta, Canada. It is on the southeast edge of Sylvan Lake, a  freshwater lake that straddles the boundary between Red Deer County and Lacombe County.

The lake is a popular destination for tourists from around Alberta, with around 1 million visitors each year. Popular tourist activities include sunbathing, swimming, water-skiing, and visiting Camp Woods. Camp Woods in Sylvan Lake hosted the 12th Canadian Scout Jamboree in July 2013.

History 
The land that would later become the town was ceded to the Crown by the First Nations with Treaty 6 in 1877.

Sylvan Lake was originally settled by French-speaking immigrants from Quebec and the United States. Arriving in 1898 from Michigan, Alexandre Loiselle and his family homesteaded the quarter section that later became the west side of today's Main (50th) Street and the businesses and homes immediately to the west. When the first settlers arrived at Sylvan Lake in 1899, the lake was named Snake Lake from the Cree name  which referred to the numerous garter snakes in the area. The name was officially changed to Sylvan Lake in 1903 (Gaetz 1948). "Sylvan" is from the Latin , which means "of a forest".

Palliser's map of 1859 gives the name Swan Lake for the location.

In the early twentieth century, groups of Estonian and then Finnish settlers moved to homesteads to the south and west of the fledgling settlement at Sylvan Lake. With their arrival came the early business community, a general store, a blacksmith, a hardware store, post office, barber, and restaurants. The completion of the Canadian Northern line to Rocky Mountain House and Nordegg in 1912 and the parallel Canadian Pacific in 1914 opened the west country to settlement and resulted in the incorporation of Sylvan Lake in 1913 under Mayor E. S. Grimson, a local hardware store owner. The anniversary of the founding of the town is celebrated every year in Sylvan Lake as "1913 Days".

Farming quickly became a mainstay in the area and in 1923 an Alberta Pacific Grain Company elevator was built on the CPR line immediately north of what is now Cottonwood Estates. The elevator was torn down in the 1970s and the CPR line was abandoned in 1983 and removed in 1986. Since then, the right of way has survived as a natural area and walking path through Sylvan Lake.

Elevators were also constructed along the CN line and were used by local farmers in the mid-century decades. They were torn down in the late 1990s.

Even prior to the building of the railways, Sylvan Lake was becoming a summer resort for families in Red Deer. With the coming of the trains, "the Lake" became a favourite of families from both Edmonton and Calgary. The summer visitors camped in tents, but soon the "Cottage Area" east of 46 Street and in "Lower Camp" on the southeast shore began to fill with summer cottages. In the 1930s and 1940s people began arriving by car and the areas around Norglenwold, Sylvan Lake Provincial Park and Jarvis Bay Provincial Park began to fill up with summer visitors.

The influx of summer residents and visitors also brought businesses and services that catered to the ever-increasing number of tourists. In 1913, the first motor launch took paying passengers on tours around the lake. A large boathouse was constructed in 1926, allowing visitors to rent a boat, canoe, swimsuit, or buy ice cream, pop and other items necessary to a summer day at the lake. Regattas were held on the lake for a number of years beginning in 1923.

In 1928, the Dominion Government, assisted by the Sylvan Lake Women's Institute (WI), built the long pier that jutted out into the lake from the bottom of Main Street. This pier was connected to the earlier WI Pier and formed a square area used for swimming and mooring boats. The first "waterslide" at Sylvan Lake was part of this facility. The piers were prone to ice damage over the winter and were replaced by the existing "landfill" that now hosts beach volleyball tournaments, dragon boat racing and the lake tour on the "Zoo Cruise".

In 1983, the original waterslide was replaced by the Wild Rapids Waterslides, which was the largest facility of its kind in western Canada until its closure in 2016.

Another byproduct of losing the piers and later the government boat launch was the construction of the Sylvan Lake Marina, home of many of the permanent boats on the lake, boating facilities, and the Sylvan Lake lighthouse.

In 2014, Sylvan Lake won the Kraft Hockeyville contest, which included a large cash prize and the rights to host an NHL pre-season game between the Calgary Flames and the Arizona Coyotes.

Geography 
The Town of Sylvan Lake is located on the southeast shore of Sylvan Lake. The summer villages of Norglenwold and Jarvis Bay border the town to the northwest and northeast respectively.

Climate
Sylvan Lake has a subarctic climate (Dfc) with long, cold winters and short, mild summers.

Seasonal mean temperatures:
 Winter  
 Spring  
 Summer 
 Fall 

Annual precipitation:
 Rain: 
 Snow: 
 Total: 

Average hours of sunshine:
2,125 hours

Demographics 

In the 2016 Census of Population conducted by Statistics Canada, the Town of Sylvan Lake recorded a population of 14,816 living in 5,616 of its 6,567 total private dwellings, a  change from its 2011 population of 12,362.

The population of the Town of Sylvan Lake according to its 2015 municipal census is 14,310, a  change from its 2013 municipal census population of 13,015. At its current population, Sylvan Lake is one of the largest towns in the province and is eligible for city status. According to Alberta's Municipal Government Act, a town is eligible for city status when it reaches 10,000 residents.

 
Visible minority status
Black: 0.9%
Filipino: 0.7%
South Asian: 0.5%
Chinese: 0.5%
Latin American: 0.4%
Japanese: 0.3%
Southeast Asian: 0.1%
Arab: 0.1%
Korean: 0.1%
West Asian: 0.0%
Visible minority, n.i.e: 0.1%
Multiple visible minorities: 0.1%
Not a visible minority: 96.2%

Religion
Protestant: 2,805 or 37.6%
Catholic: 1,815 or 24.4%
Other Christian: 380 or 5.1%
Buddhist: 25 or 0.3%
Eastern religions: 10 or 0.1%
Other: 1 or 0.01%
No religion: 2,410 or 32.4%

Government 
Federal
Sylvan Lake is within the Red Deer—Lacombe federal electoral district. It is represented by Blaine Calkins of the Conservative Party.

Provincial
Sylvan Lake is within the Innisfail-Sylvan Lake provincial electoral district. It is represented by Devin Dreeshen of the United Conservative Party.

Municipal
Sylvan Lake Town Council consists of one Mayor and six Councillors that are elected every four years. The current mayor is Megan Hanson, who was first elected as a Councillor in 2013 and as mayor in the 2021 municipal election. Councillors elected in the 2021 municipal election were Kjeryn Dakin, Jas Payne, Teresa Rilling, Tim Mearns, Graham Parsons, and Kendall Kloss. Ian Oostindie was elected in a by election when Kendall Kloss resigned his seat in 2022.

Education 

The town has six public schools in the Chinook's Edge School District.

 Beacon Hill Elementary School
 C. P. Blakely School
 Fox Run School
 H.J. Cody School
 Steffie Woima Elementary School
 Sylvan Lake Career High

Two Catholic Schools in the Red Deer Catholic Regional Schools Division.
 École Mother Teresa Catholic School
 Our Lady of the Rosary

Also, Lighthouse Christian Academy and Sylvan Meadows Adventist School are two private schools that operate in Sylvan Lake.

Media 
Sylvan Lake is served by one local newspaper, The Sylvan Lake News.

Sports 

The Sylvan Lake Gulls of the Western Canadian Baseball League play at Pogadl Park.

The Sylvan Lake Wranglers of the Heritage Junior Hockey League play at the NexSource Centre.

See also 
List of communities in Alberta
List of towns in Alberta

References

External links 

1912 establishments in Alberta
Populated places established in 1898
Towns in Alberta